Corina Morariu and Larisa Neiland were the defending champions, but none competed this year.

Julie Halard-Decugis and Anna Kournikova won the title by defeating Sabine Appelmans and Rita Grande 6–3, 6–0 in the final.

Seeds

Draw

Draw

References

External links
 Main draw (WTA)
 ITF tournament edition details

Thalgo
2000 Thalgo Australian Women's Hardcourts